Susan Penelope Rosse (also known as Susannah Penelope Rosse) (1652–1700) was an English painter. She painted portrait miniatures. She was the daughter of Richard Gibson. Her most notable artwork is a portrait of Gilbert Burnet.

Life
Susan Penelope Gibson was born in 1652. She was raised in London. Her father was miniature painter Richard Gibson. She grew up next to artist Samuel Cooper. They remained close friends for their entire lives. She married jeweler Michael Rosse. The couple lived in London on Henrietta Street. The home was formerly owned by Samuel Cooper.

Work
She learned how to paint miniatures from her father. She painted members of the court of Charles II of England.  She also painted many portraits of her neighbors while living on Henrietta Street. She was said to have created work that exceeded in quality that of her father and owed a lot to the skills of Samuel Cooper.

References

1652 births
1700 deaths
Portrait miniaturists
Painters from London
17th-century English women
English women painters
17th-century English painters